Kenmore, also known as Kenmore Plantation, is a plantation house at 1201 Washington Avenue in Fredericksburg, Virginia.  Built in the 1770s, it was the home of Fielding and Betty Washington Lewis and is the only surviving structure from the  Kenmore plantation.

The house is architecturally notable for the remarkable decorative plaster work on the ceilings of many rooms on the first floor. In 1970 the property was declared a National Historic Landmark.

Kenmore is owned and operated as a house museum by The George Washington Foundation (formerly George Washington's Fredericksburg Foundation), and is open daily for guided tours.  The Foundation also owns nearby Ferry Farm, where George Washington lived as a child.

History
The house was completed in 1776 for Fielding and Betty Washington Lewis, the sister of George Washington. He was a planter and successful merchant in town.  Their plantation grew tobacco, wheat, and corn by the labor of slaves.  The Lewises enslaved more than 80 people on the 1300-acre plantation, including a number of domestic slaves. The mansion's rear frontage was oriented to the Rapahannock River for easy transportation access.

Betty's mother Mary Ball Washington was buried on the grounds, which she had liked to visit. Lewis descendants sold the house and property in 1797 after Betty Washington Lewis' death.  A memorial was erected in 1894 at the Mary Ball Washington gravesite.

The Samuel Gordon family purchased the property in 1819.  They named it Kenmore for the home of their ancestors in Scotland. Other nineteenth century owners restored the plaster ceilings.

During the American Civil War, the plantation house  and outbuildings were used as a makeshift Union military hospital after the Battle of the Wilderness in 1864. It was also used by federal troops on their way to Richmond at the close of the war.

In 1922 the Kenmore Foundation bought the property and began plans to preserve it. Two flanking dependencies were reconstructed.  The landscaping was restored in 1924 by Charles F. Gillette.

Today the house and reconstructed dependencies stand on three acres of ground at 1201 Washington Avenue.  It was listed on the National Register of Historic Places in 1969 and was designated a National Historic Landmark in 1970.  It is included in the Washington Avenue Historic District.

See also
List of National Historic Landmarks in Virginia
National Register of Historic Places listings in Fredericksburg, Virginia

References

External links
 

African American Historic Sites Database, Virginia African Heritage Program

Historic American Buildings Survey in Virginia
Georgian architecture in Virginia
Historic house museums in Virginia
Houses completed in 1776
Houses in Fredericksburg, Virginia
Houses on the National Register of Historic Places in Virginia
Lewis family
Museums in Fredericksburg, Virginia
National Historic Landmarks in Virginia
Plantation houses in Virginia
Washington family residences
National Register of Historic Places in Fredericksburg, Virginia
Individually listed contributing properties to historic districts on the National Register in Virginia